The Central or Middle Ore Mountains ( or Mittelerzgebirge) is a natural region that forms the central-western part of the Ore Mountains in the German federal state of Saxony. It is part of the overarching unit, the Saxon Highlands and Uplands. It forms the eastern part of the former major units, the Lower Western Ore Mountains (Unteres Westerzgebirge, 423) and Upper Western Ore Mountains (Oberes Westerzgebirge, 421) and is separated from the Eastern Ore Mountains in the east by the (included) valley of the Flöha, and from the Western Ore Mountains in the west by the (excluded) valley of the Schwarzwasser and, below its mouth, by the  Zwickauer Mulde.

The upper regions of the Central Ore Mountains are part of the Ore Mountains/Vogtland Nature Park.

See also 

 Western Ore Mountains
 Eastern Ore Mountains
 List of mountains in the Ore Mountains
 List of mountains in Saxony

References

Sources 

 Federal Agency for Nature Conservation (BfN)
 Map services
 Landscape fact files
 Upper regions on the northern slopes of the Western and Central Ore Mountains
 Lower regions of the Central Ore Mountains

Geography of the Ore Mountains
Natural regions of Saxony